The heyoka (also spelled "haokah," "heyokha") is a kind of sacred clown in the culture of the Sioux (Lakota and Dakota people) of the Great Plains of North America. The heyoka is a contrarian, jester, and satirist, who speaks, moves and reacts in an opposite fashion to the people around them.

The Lakota medicine man, Black Elk, described himself as a heyoka, saying he had been visited as a child by the thunder beings.

Social role 
The  is thought of as being in charge for above and below, or are more in charge for the dead, instead of the living. This manifests by their doing not always everything like the others. For example, if food is scarce, a  may sit around and complain about how full he is; during a baking hot heat wave, a  might shiver with cold and put on gloves and cover himself with a thick blanket. Similarly, when it is freezing he might wander around naked, complaining that it is too hot. A unique example is the famous  sacred clown called "the Straighten-Outer":

His satire presents important questions by fooling around. They ask difficult questions, and say things others are too afraid to say. Their behavior poses questions as do Zen koans. By reading between the lines, the audience is able to think about things not usually thought about, or to look at things in a different way.

Principally, the  functions both as a mirror and teacher at the same time, using extreme behaviors to mirror others, and forcing them to examine their own doubts, fears, hatreds, and weaknesses.  have the power to heal emotional pain; such power comes from the experience of shame—they sing of shameful events in their lives, beg for food, and live as clowns. They provoke laughter in distressing situations of despair, and provoke fear and chaos when people feel complacent and overly secure, to keep them from taking themselves too seriously or believing they are more powerful than they are.

In addition, sacred clowns serve an important role in shaping tribal codes. Unbound by societal constraints,  are able to violate cultural taboos freely and thus critique established customs. Paradoxically, however, by violating these norms and taboos, they help to define the accepted boundaries, rules, and societal guidelines for ethical and moral behavior. They are the only ones who can ask "Why?" about sensitive topics; they use satire to question the specialists and carriers of sacred knowledge or those in positions of power and authority.

Vision of thunder beings 

In Lakota mythology,  is also a spirit of thunder and lightning. He is said to use the wind as sticks to beat the drum of thunder. His emotions are portrayed opposite the norm; he laughs when he is sad and cries when he is happy, cold makes him sweat and heat makes him shiver. In art, he is depicted as having two horns, which marks him as a hunting spirit. In some visions, he also appeared as a snow bird, a swallow, a horse, a dog, a night hawk, a frog, or a dragonfly.

In popular culture 
In 2013, Half Acre brewery in Chicago, Illinois, released what they called Heyoka IPA, which became one of their signature beers. It won a silver medal at the Great American Beer Festival in October 2014. Members of the American Indian Movement and other Native American activists argued that giving the name of a sacred figure in Lakota spirituality to a beer constituted cultural appropriation. Half Acre renamed their beer Senita (perhaps after the Senita cactus found in the American Southwest that is depicted on the former Heyoka beer can).

See also 
 Avadhuta
 Clown society
 Contrary (social role)
 Divine madness (religion)
 Foolishness for Christ
 Pueblo clown
 The Fool (tarot card)
 Trickster

References

Bibliography 
 Wilson D. Wallis. Heyoka: Rites of Reversal. Lakota Books, 1996 reprint.

Ritual clowns
Tutelary deities
Lakota culture
Lakota spirit beings
Thunder gods
Trickster gods
Lakota words and phrases